The longspine snipefish, bellowfish, common bellowsfish, snipe-fish, snipefish, spine trumpet fish, or trumpetfish, Macroramphosus scolopax, is a snipefish of the genus Macroramphosus. It is also known as the slender snipefish off the South African coast.

Distribution
This fish is found worldwide in tropical to subtropical water in the Atlantic, Indian, and west Pacific Oceans, at depths of ea. It has also been observed in the eastern Pacific off Santa Catalina Island, California.

Description
Longspine snipefish are reddish pink dorsally but have silvery bellies. They have a large eye, long snouts and a slender spine protruding dorsally.

Ecology
The longspine snipefish feeds on crustacean zooplankton such as copepods and ostracods, as well as benthic invertebrates.

In the month-long NORFANZ Expedition of 2003 which examined the biodiversity of the seamounts and slopes of the Norfolk Ridge, 5000 specimens averaging  were collected from three locations.

Reproduction
Courting males follow and swim parallel to the female near the bottom. The two fish join by their caudal peduncle, and the genital papilla of the female extends and contacts the genital region of the male repeatedly. Courting males change color and act aggressively with other males prior to this process.

References

 Tony Ayling & Geoffrey Cox, Collins Guide to the Sea Fishes of New Zealand,  (William Collins Publishers Ltd., Auckland, New Zealand 1982) 

Centriscidae
Fish described in 1758
Taxa named by Carl Linnaeus